Marek Bílek (born 7 January 1973) is a retired Czech discus thrower.

He was born in Prague and represented the club Dukla Prague. He won the bronze medal at the 1992 World Junior Championships and competed at the 1996 Olympic Games without reaching the final. He became Czech champion in 1995.

His personal best throw was 62.40 metres, achieved in 1996.

He is the twin brother of Martin Bílek.

References 

1973 births
Living people
Czechoslovak male discus throwers
Czech male discus throwers
Olympic athletes of the Czech Republic
Athletes (track and field) at the 1996 Summer Olympics
Twin sportspeople
Czech twins
Athletes from Prague